Sardar Papa Rayudu is a 1980 Indian Telugu-language historical fiction film  written and directed by Dasari Narayana Rao about an Indian revolutionary "Sardar Papa Rayudu" and his fight against the British Raj. Produced by Kranthi Kumar, starring N. T. Rama Rao, Sridevi and Sharada, with music composed by Chakravarthy. The film was remade in Hindi as Sarfarosh (1985).

Plot 
A sincere police officer Ramu and Vijaya, are in love. Vijaya's father, Dharmaraju, is a corrupt politician who fakes the good gentleman image outside. He, along with two more guys named Satya Murthy and Nyayapathi, exploited the poor by joining hands with the British. When Dharmaraju meets Ramu with his daughter, he immediately goes back to his past. Dharmaraju, Satya Murthy, and Nyayapathi kill a king, Vijayaraghavaraju, in the Andaman islands and throw the crime over a sincere gentleman and a great freedom fighter, Sardar Paparayudu. Sardar Paparayudu gets a life sentence. The reason why Dharmaraju is shocked seeing Ramu is that the latter exactly resembles Sardar Paparayudu in facial features. In fact, Ramu is the son of Sardar Paparayudu. Ramu's mother, Seeta, is the wife of Sardar Paparayudu. Right from then, Dharmaraju gets terrified, and to make things worse for him, Sardar Paparayudu gets released from jail as a result of reducing the imprisonment. He decides to take revenge on Dharmaraju for wrongly imprisoning him, and a rift starts between him and his son Ramu. Sardar Paparayudu comes between fight to save his son and others Dharmaraju fires on Paparayudu, but also he saves them at the end Paparayudu hugs Ramu before his dies.

Cast

Soundtrack 

The music was composed by Chakravarthy. Sri Sri, Rajashri, and Dasari Narayana Rao penned the lyrics.

Reception 
Venkatram of Andhra Patrika appreciated the direction, screenplay and dialogues by Dasari Narayana Rao, songs by Chakravarthy and the performances of the cast.

References

External links 
 

1980 films
1980s Telugu-language films
Fictional revolutionaries
Alternate history films
Indian epic films
Films set in Andhra Pradesh
Films about corruption in India
Films about rebellions
Films directed by Dasari Narayana Rao
Films scored by K. Chakravarthy
Films set in the British Raj
Films set in the Indian independence movement
Indian films about revenge
Indian historical action films
Indian nonlinear narrative films
Films about real people
Indian prison films
Telugu films remade in other languages